The molecular formula C4H9Br, (molar mass: 137.02 g/mol, exact mass: 135.9888 u) may refer to:

 1-Bromobutane 
 2-Bromobutane 
 tert-Butyl bromide
1-bromo-2-methylpropane

Molecular formulas